Harder na Rass is a dub reggae album by Lincoln Thompson released in 1979. It is the dub for his Experience album.

Track listing
"Interstellar Over Dub"
"Second Sight"
"Nebular Dub"
"Time Wharp"
"Universally Dubbed"
"Terrestrial Dub"
"Gravitational Echoes"
"Dub Vortex"
"Regenerated Dub"
"Cosmic Silence"

1979 albums
Lincoln Thompson albums
Dub albums